Mihály Pollack (born as Michael Pollack, August 30, 1773—January 5, 1855) was an Austrian-born Hungarian architect, key figure of neoclassical architecture. His main work is the Hungarian National Museum (1837–46).

Mihály Pollack was born in Vienna in 1773. Between 1793-94 he moved to Milan to his half-brother architect Leopold Pollack. In 1798 he moved to Pest, where in 1808 he took a lead role in the city's Beautification Commission, and became increasingly influential. Between 1810 and 1830 he designed many residential buildings, later larger palaces and public buildings. His architectural expression progressed from baroque towards neoclassical style.  He died, aged 81, in Pest.

See also

References

External links

Hungarian architects
1773 births
1855 deaths
Neoclassical architects
Neoclassical architecture in Hungary
Hungarian National Museum